Beta-1,3-galactosyltransferase 5 is an enzyme that in humans is encoded by the B3GALT5 gene.

This gene is a member of the beta-1,3-galactosyltransferase (beta3GalT) gene family. This family encodes type II membrane-bound glycoproteins with diverse enzymatic functions using different donor substrates (UDP-galactose and UDP-N-acetylglucosamine) and different acceptor sugars (N-acetylglucosamine, galactose, N-acetylgalactosamine). The beta3GalT genes are distantly related to the Drosophila Brainiac gene and have the protein coding sequence contained in a single exon. The beta3GalT proteins also contain conserved sequences not found in the beta4GalT or alpha3GalT proteins. The carbohydrate chains synthesized by these enzymes are designated as type 1, whereas beta4GalT enzymes synthesize type 2 carbohydrate chains. The ratio of type 1:type 2 chains changes during embryogenesis. By sequence similarity, the beta3GalT genes fall into at least two groups: beta3GalT4 and 4 other beta3GalT genes (beta3GalT1-3, beta3GalT5). This gene encodes the most probable candidate for synthesis of the type 1 Lewis antigens which are frequently found to be elevated in gastrointestinal and pancreatic cancers. The encoded protein is inactive with N-linked glycoproteins and functions in mucin glycosylation. Five transcript variants have been described which differ in the 5' UTR. All transcript variants encode an identical protein.

References

Further reading

External links